"Lotus Flower Bomb" is a song by American hip hop recording artist Wale, released as the lead single from his second studio album Ambition. The song was officially released on October 11, 2011 through Allido Records, Maybach Music Group and Warner Bros. The song, featuring R&B singer Miguel, was produced by Jerrin Howard. The song received a nomination for Best Rap Song at the 55th Grammy Awards.

Background 
Wale released "Lotus Flower Bomb" on October 11, 2011, a few weeks before the release of his highly anticipated second studio album "Ambition".

Remixes 
Rapper Nelly did a remix to "Lotus Flower Bomb", which appeared on his 2011 mixtape O.E.M.O..

Music video 
The music video shot in Atlanta, Georgia, was directed by Taj. The video depicts a scene from Poetic Justice, where Wale is a mailman who is trying to charm the beauty salon owner played by Bre Scullark from America's Next Top Model. The car depicted in the video is a Lotus Evora.

Chart performance 
"Lotus Flower Bomb" charted on the U.S. Billboard Hot 100 for the week of October 18, 2011 at #87. The song peaked at #38 on the Hot 100, making it Wale's biggest hit as a lead artist, until his 2013 single, "Bad", which peaked at #21 on the Hot 100. As of July 2013, the song has sold 620,000 copies.

Charts

Weekly charts

Year-end charts

Decade-end charts

Certifications

Release information

See also
 List of number-one R&B singles of 2012 (U.S.)

References

2011 singles
2011 songs
Wale (rapper) songs
Miguel (singer) songs
Maybach Music Group singles
Songs written by Miguel (singer)
Songs written by Wale (rapper)
Songs written by Sam Dew